Ann Valentine (11 January 1762 – 13 October 1842 or 13 October 1845) was an English organist and composer, part of a talented family of Leicester musicians.

Life
Ann Valentine was born on 11 January 1762 in Leicester and christened on 15 March. Her father John Valentine (1730–91) was a great-nephew of the composer Robert Valentine. John Valentine was a composer, music teacher, and musician. He played viola in the memorial concerts (the Handel Commemoration) held for George Frederic Handel in London in 1784; his son, Ann's brother Thomas Valentine (1759 – c. 1800) was a second violinist in the same concerts, and performed in London for at least the next decade. Another uncle, Henry Valentine, was an oboist and ran a music shop in Leicester. Ann's younger sister Sarah (1771–1843) was an organist at St Martin's Church in  Leicester from 1800, and composed at least one work, The British March and Quickstep for the Pianoforte. Ann made her concert debut on the harpsichord in a family concert in 1777, at the age of fifteen. From c. 1785 to at least 1834 she was the organist at St Margaret's Church, Leicester. In 1790 she published a set of ten sonatas for harpsichord or piano with violin or flute accompaniment. She continued to publish music, although only some of it has survived; the ten sonatas and an arrangement of the strathspey Monny Musk are available in a modern edition.

Works (partial list)
Ten Sonatas for the pianoforte or harpsichord and violin or flute (1790)
Monny Musk for keyboard (c. 1798)

References

1762 births
1840s deaths
18th-century English people
19th-century English people
Classical-period composers
English classical composers
Women classical composers
English classical pianists
English women pianists
People from Leicester
Musicians from Leicestershire
18th-century keyboardists
19th-century women composers
18th-century women composers
18th-century English women
19th-century English women
19th-century women pianists